VirtualDJ Radio is a live mixed webradio with DJs around the world.

It started in 2005 with one channel, where DJs mixed mostly house and dance music. In 2008, a new channel was added for DJs mixing urban music such as hiphop, dancehall and reggaeton. In 2010, a third channel was added for trance, minimal, progressive house, tech house and more. As of June 2011, it had over 24,000 members.

VirtualDJ Radio supports most major media players, including iTunes, Winamp and RealPlayer. Listeners can also tune in with digital radio devices and phone apps, using the standard Shoutcast and Radiotime directories.

References

External links

Internet radio stations